Tone Thiis Schjetne  (19 July 1928 – 2 September 2015) was a Norwegian sculptor. She is represented in the National Gallery of Norway and other galleries, contributed several works to the Nidaros Cathedral, and made decorations to Vadsø Church. Among her best known public works is the bronze sculpture Go'dagen in Oslo, Trondheim and Stavanger.

Personal life
Schjetne was born in Oslo, Norway to architect Helge Thiis (1897-1972) and painter Greta Swenborg Thiis (1896-1982). Her grandfather was museum director Jens Thiis (1870–1942). Her aunt Ragna Thiis Stang (1909-1978) was a historian. Her elder sister Aina is a ceramist, who was married to sculptor Kristofer Leirdal from 1947. Schjetne was married to physician Per Gunnar Schjetne; they settled in Sandnessjøen and had three children.

Career
Schjetne was a student of Kristofer Leirdal at the Trondheim Academy of Fine Art from 1946-47. She trained under Per Palle Storm at the Norwegian National Academy of Fine Arts in 1947-49 and with Einar Utzon-Frank at the Royal Danish Academy of Fine Arts in Copenhagen.

She debuted at the Autumn Exhibition (Høstutstillingen) in Oslo in 1950. For many years she was sculptor at Nidaros Cathedral in Trondheim. She is represented in the National Gallery of Norway and other galleries. She contributed a sculpture of Saint Peter the apostle at Vadsø Church in Finnmark. Her public works include Høylandsfrisen (1975) at the Sandnes City Hall, the bronze bust honoring the poet and novelist Tarjei Vesaas (1986) in Åmot in Vinje, and the sculptures Klovn and To klovner (1992) at Grønlands torg in Oslo.

Her most widely recognized work is the bronze statue Go'dagen (1980) which appears in Stavanger and Trondheim. The sculpture was modeled after Anna Kornelia Holm (1885-1962) who had worked as a maid and in retirement was frequently seen at Torvet, Trondheim's market square, 
where her standard greeting was go' day  (Go'dagen).

Schjetne was awarded the Lorch-Schives legat in 1954 and the Conrad Mohrs legat in 1956.

Selected works
Go'dagen I  (Bronze. 1956) National Gallery
Berit Olaug  (Bronze. 1955) National Gallery
Italienerinne	(Bronze. 1955) National Gallery
Morgenkåpen II (Bronze. 1976) National Gallery

References

Further reading

1928 births
2015 deaths
Businesspeople from Oslo
People from Alstahaug
Oslo National Academy of the Arts alumni
Royal Danish Academy of Fine Arts alumni
20th-century Norwegian sculptors
Norwegian women sculptors